Strings of Autumn is an international music festival which takes place every year between September and November in Prague, Czech Republic. The festival features a mix of jazz, classical music, experimental music, and world music. Its program is divided into three distinct categories, each with a particular musical focus: Inspiration, Crossover, and Luminaries. Strings of Autumn has been running since 1996.

Early years 

Strings of Autumn was founded by Marek Vrabec in 1996 at the instigation of President Vaclav Havel, who hoped to start up a regular program of concerts at Prague Castle. These concerts often took place in parts of the castle previously inaccessible to the public. The first year featured mostly Czech artists, but in 1997 the festival showcased its first international artists, among them Jan Garbarek and the Hilliard Ensemble, who were making their first appearance in the Czech Republic. As the festival gained stature, it was able to attract an increasing number of high profile artists, including Michael Nyman, Magdalena Kozena and Oleg Maisenberg.

Removal of state funding 

In 2004 a new president, Vaclav Klaus, was sworn in. The change of president led to a change in cultural policy at the castle, and the new administration announced it would no longer support Strings of Autumn. This was a major blow for the festival, which had by that point become a popular and established annual event. Klaus' decision received vigorous criticism, and a music magazine, Harmonie, nominated the castle administration for an 'anti-award,' suggesting that they had "decided to cancel one of the most interesting projects – in terms of artistic programming and performance – that exist in this country."

A lack of financial support or venues presented a substantial threat to the festival, but eventually new sponsors were found, and the festival took place again in 2004 in a reduced form, featuring performances by the Kronos Quartet and the Uri Caine ensemble.

2005 - present 

Strings of Autumn subsequently established partnerships with new venues in Prague, including the Rudolfinum, the Estates Theatre, the Municipal House, and Prague Crossroads. With the continued backing of the City of Prague and of private sponsors, the festival returned in 2005 with a program of ten concerts, including the return of Michael Nyman and the Czech debut of Gary Burton. In the years that followed, the festival continued to stage performances from international artists who had never played in the country before. Artists who have performed at Strings since 2005 include Brad Mehldau, Cassandra Wilson, Bobby McFerrin and Ute Lemper.

In 2010, the 15th anniversary of the festival, Strings of Autumn held a donors' gala evening at Municipal House in Prague, an unusual event for a Czech non-profit cultural organisation. Bobby McFerrin performed at the gala, which was attended by public figures including Vaclav Havel and the Czech Prime Minister, Jan Fischer.

See also
 Designblok

References

External links 
 Strings of Autumn - English site
'A Festival for All Seasons'

Classical music festivals in the Czech Republic
Festivals in Prague
Music festivals established in 1996
Autumn events in the Czech Republic
1996 establishments in the Czech Republic
Jazz festivals in the Czech Republic